Pernelle Carron (born 20 August 1986) is a French former competitive ice dancer. With partner Lloyd Jones, she is the 2013 Winter Universiade champion, 2010 Cup of Nice champion, three-time NRW Trophy champion, and 2010 French national champion. She won bronze at two Grand Prix events, 2011 Cup of China and 2007 Skate Canada International, and competed at the 2014 Winter Olympics in Sochi.

Personal life 
Carron was born on 20 August 1986 in Gleize, France. She studied interior architecture and design at CREAD School in Lyon.

Career

Early partnerships 
Pernelle Carron started skating at age six. She started skating because her aunt has Down Syndrome and all the family was going skating with her. Her aunt, Clothilde Fedry, participated several times at the Special Olympics and won the bronze medal as a solo figure skater.

Carron skated with Edouard Dezutter for twelve years and finished 13th at the 2005 World Junior Championships.

In the summer of 2005, Carron teamed up with Mathieu Jost. Together, they were the 2006 and 2007 French national bronze medalists and the 2008 and 2009 French national silver medalists. Carron and Jost also won a bronze medal at the 2007 Skate Canada International, finished 6th at the 2009 European Championships, and were ninth in their only appearance at the World Championships. Carron ended her partnership with Jost in April 2009.

Partnership with Lloyd Jones 
Carron teamed up with Lloyd Jones in April 2009. They were coached by Muriel Boucher-Zazoui and Romain Haguenauer in Lyon, France, at the start of their partnership.

In their first season together, Carron and Jones won the NRW Trophy and became the French national champions. Carron and Jones were 12th at the European Championships and at that season's World Championships.

In the 2010–2011 season, they again won the 2010 NRW Trophy, as well as the 2010 Coupe de Nice, and finished 5th and 4th in two Grand Prix assignments, 2011 Skate Canada and the 2010 Trophee Eric Bompard, respectively. At the French Championships, they finished second to Nathalie Pechalat / Fabian Bourzat. They moved up to 9th at the European Championships and again finished 12th at Worlds. After the season ended, they moved to the United States to be coached by Natalia Linichuk.

In 2011–12, Carron and Jones began their season by taking silver at the 2011 Cup of Nice. They then won their first Grand Prix medal together, bronze, at the 2011 Cup of China. At the end of the season, they moved to the United Kingdom to be coached by Marika Humphreys.

After retiring from competition the two skated in ice shows. They appeared as the principal couple for Holiday on Ice's Passion Tour. Carron has also worked as an ice skating coach and choreographer.

Programs

With Jones

With Jost

With Dezutter

Competitive highlights 
GP: Grand Prix; JGP: Junior Grand Prix

With Jones

With Jost

With Dezutter

References

External links 

 
 
 

1986 births
Living people
People from Gleizé
French female ice dancers
Figure skaters at the 2007 Winter Universiade
Medalists at the 2007 Winter Universiade
Figure skaters at the 2014 Winter Olympics
Olympic figure skaters of France
Universiade medalists in figure skating
Sportspeople from Rhône (department)
Universiade gold medalists for France
Universiade bronze medalists for France
Competitors at the 2013 Winter Universiade